Louis George was a Prussian master watchmaker of the late baroque era.

Louis George was a descendant of French Huguenots living in Berlin in the third generation. Louis George produced mainly daedal watches. Reported makes are: pocket watches, nautical clocks, mechanical odometer, console clocks, long case clocks, dead second watches.

Working period
On the 26 December 1769 Louis George applied for the patent as the royal watchmaker and succeeded. He was allowed to call himself from now on “Horloger du Roy” — in English, "watchmaker to the king". French was the language of the Berlin nobility.

The literature on Louis George reports different working periods. The writer Gerhard Koenig states in his book a working period from 1769 to 1796. The address calendar of Berlin lists the Louis George in the editions of the years 1799 and 1801.

The addresses of Louis George's workshops mentioned at the Berlin Adresskalender are Schlossplatz 10 and 13 (in 1799) and Schlossplatz 10 in (1801), right opposite the Stadtschloss (city palace) of Berlin. Starting in 1815 Louis George et compagnie produced lever pocket watches, most probably a son of the royal watchmaker.

Watchmaker to the King
Louis George was a talented watchmaker and artist. He did not just create watches but real gems of watch making. His posh watches enchanted the audience and recovered the respect of the Berlin nobility and solvent bourgeoisie. His business flourished and he was capable of opening a second shop in the same street opposite the royal city palace.

Located at Berlin he provided watches for three generations of Prussians kings:
 Frederick II. (the Great) King of Prussia
 his nephew and successor Frederick William II. King of Prussia
 his nephew and successor Frederick William III. King of Prussia

Other German monarchs appreciated the masterly crafted clocks and watches too. A long case clock with an organ movement formerly owned by Georg I. Duke of Saxe-Meiningen is preserved on castle of Elisabethenburg at Meiningen.
It can be visited at the art collection of the Meininger Museen at the Schloss Elisabethenburg Inventory-No. II 1908, height 2,93 m. approx. 1790; watch dial reads: „Ls. GEORGE HORLOGER DU ROY“ / „A BERLIN“. The curator M. Ruszwurm reports that clock is equipped with a precious flute watch (also called organ watch).

A console clock with an attached flute work is exhibited at the Schloss Sanssouci at Potsdam.

European market
Louis Georges watches and clocks can be found all over Europe. A bedroom clock displaying hour, minute and date with a rich decorated and gold-plated case was auctioned in Paris in 2005. Other clocks made by Louis George have been found in Spain.

Louis George discussed technical problems of watchmaking with other watchmakers from the Swiss Canton of Neuchâtel. He had business connections with the Swiss watchmaker Pierre Jaquet-Droz and Jean-Frédéric Leschot. These watchmakers tried to find technical solutions going far beyond the requirements of ordinary watch making. Jaquet-Droz created mechanical puppet automats. Louis George created complicated clocks with an attached organ or flute work.

Berlin – the Baroque Hub of watchmaking 
Berlin was considered a hub for the production of organ and flute clocks. The clock movements released an attached organ, flute or harp unit at a preset time – working like a music alarm clock.

Sites of historical Louis George Clocks
 Musée d´Art et d´Histoire, Geneve, Switzerland: Dead Seconds Watch (Inventory No. H2006-106)
 Schloss Sanssouci, Maulbeerallee, 14469 Potsdam, Germany
 Art collection of the Museums at Meiningen - Schloss Elisabethenburg, PF 100554, 98605 Meiningen, Germany

Bibliography
 Uhren und Uhrmacherei in Berlin 1450 - 1900 - Miniaturen zur Geschichte, Kultur und Denkmalspflege Berlins, Kulturband der DDR, Berlin 1988, by Gerhard König
 
 
 
 
 
 Le Grand Frédéric et ses horlogers: une émigration d'horlogers suisses au XVIIIme siècle; un demi-siècle d'horlogerie berlinoise (1760–1810), by Alfred Chapuis, publisher: Journal suisse d'horlogerie et de bijouterie, 1938, page 64 and 65, illustration of a Louis George pocket watch

External links
 Louis George dead second pocket watch with Pouzait escapement exhibited at the 13e Journée d'étude de la Société Suisse de Chronométrie
 LOUIS GEORGE website

History
 Berlin address calendar of 1799 at the Historische Sammlungen of the Zentral und Landesbibliothek Berlin, Breite Str.36, 10178 Berlin, Germany
 Berlin address calendar of 1801 at the Historische Sammlungen of the Zentral und Landesbibliothek Berlin, Breite Str.36, 10178 Berlin, Germany
 Luisenstädtischer Bildungsverein, Berlin – Berlin history web portal, registered association

Year of birth missing
Year of death missing
People from Berlin
German watchmakers (people)